Żegoty  is a village in the administrative district of Gmina Kiwity, within Lidzbark County, Warmian-Masurian Voivodeship, in northern Poland.

The village has an approximate population of 400.

To the southwest of the village lies the Jezioro Blanki lake.

References

Villages in Lidzbark County